Antoine Zahra (born 5 March 1977, Mosta, Malta) is a professional footballer currently playing for Maltese Premier League side Birkirkara, where he plays as a midfielder.

Playing career

Birkirkara
Zahra has always been loyal to Birkirkara, and played for Birkirkara Luxol, the result of merger between Birkirkara and Luxol St. Andrews, which lasted only two seasons. He returned to Birkirkara's squad list.

External links
 Antoine Zahra at MaltaFootball.com
 

Maltese footballers
Malta international footballers
1977 births
Living people
Birkirkara F.C. players
Association football midfielders
People from Mosta